Coleophora lunensis is a moth of the family Coleophoridae. It is found in Mongolia and the Lower Volga region of southern Russia.

Adults are on wing in August.

References

lunensis
Moths described in 1975
Moths of Asia
Moths of Europe